Musabek Turghynbekuly Alimbekov (Mūsabek Tūrğynbekūly Älımbekov); is a Kazakh politician who served as the fourth chairman of the supreme court of Kazakhstan.

References 
 ВС Казахстана

1954 births
Living people
Kazakhstani politicians
Kazakhstani jurists
People from Jambyl Region